In algebra, a p-basis is a generalization of the notion of a separating  transcendence basis for a field extension of characteristic p, introduced by .

Definition

Suppose k is a field of characteristic p  and K is a field extension. A p-basis is a set of elements xi of K such that the elements dxi form a basis for the  K-vector space ΩK/k of differentials.

Examples

 If K is a finitely generated separable extension of k then a p-basis is the same as a separating transcendence basis. In particular in this case the number of elements of the p-basis is the transcendence degree.
 If k is a field, x an indeterminate, and K the field generated by all elements x1/pn then the empty set is a p-basis, though the extension is separable and has transcendence degree 1.
 If K is a degree p extension of k obtained by adjoining a pth root t of an element of k then t is a p-basis, so a p-basis has cardinality 1 while the transcendence degree is 0.

References

 

Field (mathematics)